The Jane Doe murder case involved the murder of an initially unknown victim who was later identified as Vivianne Lynda Ruiz. Prior to being identified, investigators and the media referred to the victim as 'Jane Doe'. It is now standard practice for police to refer to an unidentified deceased person as John or Jane Doe. The murder of Vivianne Ruiz is thought to be the first officially recorded 'Jane Doe' in Australia. The unique fingerprint evidence that would ultimately convict her killer was also unprecedented.

On 28 December 1991, a deceased person wrapped in garbage bags was located in Sydney, Australia. No identification was found on or near the victim. At the post mortem, strangulation by ligature was found to be the cause of death. Animal hairs thought to be from a German Shepherd dog were found on the victim's clothing. Newspaper was located inside her mouth. On its removal, fingerprints in what appeared to be blood were present but could not be immediately identified. Investigators spent many weeks attempting to identify the victim. A sustained and significant media campaign was also conducted. Investigators were eventually contacted by a former associate of the victim who recognised her as Vivianne Ruiz.

Investigators discovered Ruiz had been in a relationship with an individual named Richard White. White was a convicted criminal with a history of assault and drug trafficking. He had grown to know Ruiz through her work as a prostitute and dancer in the Kings Cross nightclubs in Sydney. Investigators discovered White had left Australia shortly after Ruiz was found murdered. The fingerprint found on the newspaper Ruiz's killer had left in her throat was initially considered not to belong to White. Later testing demonstrated that a tonal reverse had occurred, a rare event where the valleys between fingerprint ridges transfer blood from the grooves of the fingerprint, as opposed to its ridges.

Investigators eventually tracked White to England, where he was living with relatives. A warrant was sought in England for his arrest, which was eventually made in Newcastle by local detectives and Scotland Yard. White returned to Australia to face trial for the murder. After two trials were aborted due to bizarre conduct, he was eventually found guilty in a judge-only trial in 1996 and sentenced to the maximum jail term permitted in New South Wales at the time, being fifteen years with a minimum of nine before being eligible for parole.

Background 
On 28 December 1991, a body was located by a cyclist on Guess Avenue in Sydney, Australia. The body was wrapped in black plastic garbage bags. The cyclist initially considered it may be the remains of a dog, however upon closer inspection he notice a human jaw visible. He attended Rockdale police station to report the finding, and police immediately attended.

Both the location of the body and it being wrapped in garbage bags indicated to investigators the victim had been murdered elsewhere. Officers searched the body and surrounding streets however to locate identification. Detectives arrived to the scene which had been contained by local officers. The female victim was in early stages of decomposition. She was found lying on her back with her knees bent upwards. Blood staining was present on her head and clothing. She had suffered head injuries and officers observed something inside her mouth which appeared at the time to be paper. A ligature was around her throat. She was wearing a white body suit, black-and-white shorts, a gold wedding ring on her right hand, and a black leather Seiko women's watch on her wrist. Investigators described the murder as "a particularly brutal, frenzied attack", and "a callous, very brutal murder."

Post-mortem 
A post death examination, known as a post-mortem or autopsy, was carried out to determine the cause, mode, and manner of death, as is common when the cause of death is suspected to be a criminal matter. Two investigators attended the Glebe Mortuary as witnesses. A third officer with expertise in fingerprints also attended. A government forensic pathologist, Johan Duflou, conducted the post-mortem. Duflou did not undress the victim, as it might have been significant in establishing her identity. As the victim's clothing was removed, sand fell onto the operating table and was collected by an investigator.

Her age was estimated to be between 16 and 25 years old. Facial hair indicated she was of Mediterranean descent. Duflou noted she was well groomed with recently painted fingernails, but could not establish the colour of the eyes due to decomposition. Additional insect samples were collected for further analysis.

Injuries to the victim included a  wound on her head and strangulation marks  in width. Bruising was present on the face and body, causing the pathologist to believe the victim had been kicked multiple times. The bruising indicated the injuries had occurred after death.

The pathologist removed the newspaper lodged within the mouth. Once opened, the newspaper was revealed to be two full sized sheets of the Sydney Morning Herald, dated the 10 December 1991. Three distinct fingerprint patterns were identified. An investigator from the Latent Fingerprint Unit of New South Wales Police referred to the newspaper as "a fingerprint jackpot". To the police, it appeared they would identify the killer before the victim. The fingerprints were photographed in-situ and then enhanced with ninhydrin, an organic compound which can detect fingerprints. The practice is commonly used by forensic investigators in the analysis of latent fingerprints on porous surfaces such as paper, as the amino acids in sweat secretions which gather on a finger's unique ridges transfer to surfaces when touched. Exposure of the surface to ninhydrin converts the amino acids into visibly coloured products and thus reveals the print. Once completed, the fingerprint was fed into the police fingerprint database, though no match was found. This initially indicated to police the killer had not been arrested previously.

Also found during the post-mortem were a significant number of animal hairs. These were analysed by a forensic biologist who confirmed under a microscope they were not human due to their internal structure. Further testing confirmed they were from a dog. Eventually, tests concluded the hairs were from a domestic dog, possibly a German Shepherd.

Investigation 
No identification of the body was possible at the end of the post-mortem. As a result, investigators turned to the evidence available to them in order to identify the victim.

The clothing worn by the victim was considered important in establishing the identity of the victim. The blouse was manufactured in Sydney. The shorts worn by the victim were one of only 18 pairs manufactured. Investigators managed to trace all but two purchases of the shorts. Her shorts being made in Sydney and watch being available only in Australia led investigators to believe she was a local. Investigators dressed a police-woman of a similar build and age in clothing similar to that worn by the victim. The same clothing was then placed on a mannequin which police displayed at train stations in the local vicinity. Police also focused on a fairground set up near to the area which had attracted a large number of visitors and workers, in the hope that either the victim or the killer were connected to the fairground. Police used photographs taken from the post-mortem to create a digitally enhanced image. Insects were removed, and the police estimated what her eyes would look like.

Several weeks after the body was found, and despite a strong community response, police were frustrated at not being able to identify the victim. The murder was considered to be the "most puzzling murder mystery in Sydney for decades", with media reports observing that not since the 1930s had an inability to identify a victim caused such difficulty in a murder investigation.

Officers were assigned to inspect missing persons files. These inspections did not identify the victim  although the missing person files on more than 100 missing women were closed as a result. At the time, a detective of the Missing Persons Unit said most of the found women had already returned home without police being informed. Others telephoned home to assure parents the body was not theirs. 

By mid-January the year after the body was found, police had fielded at least 20 calls a day from people offering information. The computer enhanced photographs were sent to each caller in the hope they could identify the victim.

Identification 
Police eventually received a phone call from a witness who claimed to recognise the victim as her friend, Vivianne Ruiz. The witness viewed the items of property of the victim in police possession and subsequently confirmed they belonged to Ruiz. The witness had met Ruiz two years prior to her murder. 

Police sought to obtain material which perhaps had been handled by Ruiz. The lease of a property in Kings Cross, New South Wales in the name of Ruiz was examined, and fingerprints on the paper matched that of the victim. Dental records later positively identified Ruiz as the victim. Ruiz was born in Spain, and had settled in Australia in 1982. She initially resided on the Gold Coast in Queensland before moving to Sydney. After moving to Sydney, Ruiz took up residence in the King's Cross property and eventually started working as a prostitute and dancer in local nightclubs.

Richard White 
The witness who had recognised Ruiz informed police that Ruiz had been dating a man named Richard White, who was also named on the King's Cross lease. The witness told police that White was a bodybuilder who routinely consumed steroids and dealt casually in amphetamine. The witness also indicated White had previously beaten Ruiz.

Police interviewed additional friends of Ruiz, who stated Ruiz and White were planning an overseas trip. A travel agent confirmed tickets had been booked together but paid for separately. On 27 December 1991, the day before Ruiz's body was found, White had contacted the travel agent and cancelled the tickets, having the refund of A$2,010 sent to his parents's home. White had also visited a bank and deposited A$4,000 on the same day. Police suspected this was money earned by Ruiz that she had stored in a shoebox at home.

Investigators then learned White had a criminal record for assault and drunk driving. His fingerprints were on file. Checks were done to see if the fingerprint found on the newspaper inside Ruiz's throat matched. The fingerprints were pictorially similar, but not identical. Further testing was conducted. Testing eventually concluded that White's fingerprint matched that found on the newspaper, with White later admitting this in court. 

In the interim, investigators sent a uniformed officer to the home where White's parents lived. The officer pretended to be following up on some traffic offences, so as not to alert White to the investigator. The parents informed the officer that he was currently living overseas at the house of his aunt and uncle in Newcastle, England. The officer noted the presence of a German Shepherd at the home. Investigators confirmed that on 2 January 1991 White had flown to the United Kingdom via Thailand. The investigators also confirmed White had previously owned a van, and after tracking down the new owner, searched the van and discovered bloodstains on the interior. The van also had hairs from a German Shepherd. These hairs were later confirmed as belonging to the dog at White's parents's house, and were the same as those found on the body of Ruiz.

Arrest 
White was found to be living with his aunt and uncle at their home in Newcastle, the hometown of his parents. White was eventually arrested by detectives from the local police station and Scotland Yard at around 9:45am on 29 April 1992.  White did not resist the arrest and his relatives were unaware of the police investigation. Investigators flew to the United Kingdom and visited White in custody. His personal effects were searched. In his possession was a set of notes written by White, one of which he had written to himself which stated "convince yourself of your innocence...don't fuck up".

Extradition 
New South Wales police applied to the Bow Street Magistrates' Court in London to have White extradited to Australia. Lawyers for White argued against the extradition in court. However, four months after his arrest, White agreed to return to Sydney voluntarily to face murder charges, with a spokesperson stating White had changed his mind and while maintaining his innocence had decided it was "in his best interests" to return. White voluntarily returned to Australia to defend the charges, returning to Sydney on 13 September 1992. White refused to be interviewed or allow samples of his blood or hair to be taken, informing police he had been advised not to cooperate. However, White was unable to refuse under law and so eventually capitulated. White was refused bail, even after his parents offered the deeds of their home as bail security.

Pre-trial proceedings 
A committal hearing was held for investigators to demonstrate to a court there was sufficient evidence for White to stand trial for the murder of Ruiz. White's lawyer questioned investigators on the fingerprint found on the newspaper within Ruiz's throat. While conceding the fingerprint belonged to White, she argued investigators were unable to establish to the required evidentiary standard that the substance forming the fingerprint was blood. She went on to propose that the tests used to demonstrate a "positive" reaction to blood would have been the same to any protein based substance, such as meat. The lawyer concluded with an argument that White may have been eating a meat pie with tomato sauce on it while reading the newspaper, and that such a food would react to the test used to demonstrate the fingerprint was blood. However, investigators rebutted this argument by demonstrating the position of the fingerprint would have meant the newspaper was being read upside down at the time the fingerprint was made. White was sent to stand trial for the murder in the Supreme Court of New South Wales.

Trial and conviction 

Two attempts were made to try White for the murder  but were aborted due to his conduct. He pointed on one occasion to the jury and asked "who are you", as well as insulting the judge and spitting during proceedings. He later threatened to kill a judge and the prosecutor. After the second trial was aborted, White was sent for a psychiatric evaluation. He was found fit to stand trial.

In June 1996, White stood trial for a third time. On this occasion, he remained quiet during proceedings. The prosecutor produced forty-two witnesses including expert witnesses in blood, hair, and fingerprints. White elected to have a judge-only trial. White's lawyers focused on the fingerprints, attempting to argue they may have appeared on the newspaper innocently at a time prior to the murder. The defence team successfully convinced the court that the blood found in White's discarded van would have been contaminated by the water used to test the sample, and that the dog hairs found on Ruiz may have come from any German Shepherd.

White told the court: "I did not kill Vivian. I had no reason to kill her. I am innocent. Thank you".

The judge acknowledged that the case made by the prosecution was circumstantial and that in isolation, the evidence presented was not compelling. The judge found that White depositing money into his account shortly after Ruiz's death was weak evidence of his guilt. The same conclusion was drawn about White fleeing overseas.

Investigators considered the fingerprint to be the key item of evidence and that everything else in the case was contingent on successfully proving the fingerprint belonged to White and was from the blood of Ruiz. The judge acknowledged the fingerprint found on the newspaper was that of White and that this evidence was the "centrepiece" of the case against White. The judge stated:

 Hidden J found White had killed Ruiz in a fit of passion. However, what triggered the attack, where Ruiz was murdered, and White's motive remain unknown.

Sentencing 
White was later sentenced to the maximum penalty applicable in New South Wales at the time: 15 years in prison of which he served at least 9 before being eligible for parole.

References

Bibliography 
Academic literature

Legal cases

News articles

Television documentaries

1990s in Australia
1991 in Australia
1991 murders in Australia
December 1991 events in Australia
Female murder victims
Murder in Sydney
Violence against women in Australia